Victoria Dunlap (born September 19, 1989 in Nashville, Tennessee) is a basketball player who  most recently played for the Seattle Storm of the Women's National Basketball Association. She had previously played at the University of Kentucky.

Kentucky statistics
Source

WNBA
Dunlap was selected the first round of the 2011 WNBA Draft (11th overall) by the Washington Mystics.

References

External links
Kentucky Wildcats bio

1989 births
Living people
African-American basketball players
All-American college women's basketball players
American women's basketball players
Basketball players from Nashville, Tennessee
Forwards (basketball)
Kentucky Wildcats women's basketball players
Seattle Storm players
Washington Mystics draft picks
Washington Mystics players
21st-century African-American sportspeople
21st-century African-American women
20th-century African-American people
20th-century African-American women